

197001–197100 

|-bgcolor=#f2f2f2
| colspan=4 align=center | 
|}

197101–197200 

|-id=189
| 197189 Raymond ||  || Sean Raymond (born 1977), an American astronomer with the Sloan Digital Sky Survey || 
|-id=196
| 197196 Jamestaylor ||  || James Taylor (born 1965) is in charge of publicity for the Huachuca Astronomy Club in Arizona, United States || 
|}

197201–197300 

|-bgcolor=#f2f2f2
| colspan=4 align=center | 
|}

197301–197400 

|-bgcolor=#f2f2f2
| colspan=4 align=center | 
|}

197401–197500 

|-bgcolor=#f2f2f2
| colspan=4 align=center | 
|}

197501–197600 

|-id=525
| 197525 Versteeg ||  || Maarten H. Versteeg (born 1960), a Staff Engineer at the Southwest Research Institute who worked for the New Horizons mission to Pluto as the lead for the Alice UV Spectrometer Instrument Software || 
|}

197601–197700 

|-bgcolor=#f2f2f2
| colspan=4 align=center | 
|}

197701–197800 

|-id=707
| 197707 Paulnohr || 2004 PN || Paul Nohr (1939–2006), coordinator of the Cincinnati Observatory who restored the observatory's 1845 Merz and Mahler and the 1904 Alvan Clark telescopes || 
|-id=708
| 197708 Kalipona ||  || Clifford "Kalipona" Livermore (born 1941) has performed astronomy outreach on Mauna Kea for over 40 years. His efforts have helped locals and visitors to appreciate the value of maintaining Mauna Kea as a protected dark-sky site. || 
|}

197801–197900 

|-id=845
| 197845 Michaelvincent ||  || Michael A. Vincent (born 1978), an Assistant Director for Research and Development at the Southwest Research Institute, who worked for the New Horizons mission to Pluto as the REX Instrument Project Manager and Deputy Payload Systems Engineer || 
|-id=856
| 197856 Tafelmusik ||  || Tafelmusik Baroque Orchestra, a Canadian Baroque orchestra based in Toronto || 
|-id=864
| 197864 Florentpagny ||  || Florent Pagny (born 1961), a French musician || 
|-id=870
| 197870 Erkman ||  || Suren Erkman (born 1955), a professor of the University of Lausanne and an industrial ecology specialist. He is a friend of Swiss amateur astronomer Michel Ory who discovered this minor planet. || 
|}

197901–198000 

|-bgcolor=#f2f2f2
| colspan=4 align=center | 
|}

References 

197001-198000